Bayt ʽAdhran is a small village in Bani Matar District of Sanaa Governorate, Yemen. It is located to the west of Sanaa, at the top of the hills overlooking the western edge of the Sanaa plain.

Name and history 
According to the 10th-century writer al-Hamdani, Bayt ʽAdhran was named after one Dhū ʽAdhrān ibn Dhī Ma'dhin ibn Jīdān, of the tribe of Himyar. Besides al-Hamdani, other medieval writers to mention Bayt ʽAdhran include al-Razi and Yaqut al-Hamawi.

References 

Villages in Sanaa Governorate